The 2007 Clemson football team represented Clemson University in the 2007 NCAA Division I FBS football season.  The Tigers were led by head coach Tommy Bowden and played their home games in Memorial Stadium.

Notable 
Clemson played host to the Florida State Seminoles on Labor Day, Monday, September 3, 2007 in both teams' season opener.  The game was played before a primetime national audience on ESPN as the only college football game in that time slot.  It was only Clemson's second regular season Monday night game, the last being in 1982 against the University of Georgia.

Clemson opened its season with 3 consecutive home game victories.  This is the first time that there have been 3 consecutive home games to open the season since 2003 and only the eighth time since 1923.  Clemson played against the 2006 Atlantic Coast Conference champion Wake Forest in November and played the 2006 Mid-American Conference champion Central Michigan for the first time.  The 2007 season saw Clemson meeting Louisiana-Monroe and Central Michigan for the first time, with Clemson beating both of them.

In the pre-season, incoming quarterback Willy Korn was named one of the top-10 impact freshman for 2007.

Achievements 
Clemson started 4–0, including a victory in the season and conference opener over the Florida State Seminoles in the ninth "Bowden Bowl", which pits father Bobby Bowden, coaching the Seminoles, against his son, Tommy.  Following their 4–0 start, Clemson gave up two losses to Georgia Tech and Virginia Tech respectively.  Following the two-game losing streak, the Tigers went on to another four-game winning streak.  The team then finished the season with its toughest loss of the season (losing in the final seconds to Boston College, 20–17) and greatest triumph (defeating rival South Carolina 23–21 with a last-second field goal).  With a record of 9–3, the Tigers received a bid to play in the 2007 Chick-fil-A Bowl.

During the September 8th game against UL-Monroe, Clemson quarterback Cullen Harper threw five touchdown passes, setting a new school record for most touchdown passes thrown in a single game, a feat he has since duplicated. He currently holds numerous school records, including touchdown passes in a season (27).

Harper need only throw for 122 yards, and leading rusher James Davis rush for 8 yards, for this to be the first Clemson team in history to have a 3,000-yard passer, 1,000-yard rusher, and 1,000 receiver (WR Aaron Kelly exceeded 1,000 for the year during game-winning drive against South Carolina).

On December 2, 2007, it was announced that Clemson had accepted a bid to play in the 2007 Chick-fil-A Bowl opposite the Southeastern Conference's Auburn Tigers.  The game will be played December 31 in front of a national audience on ESPN.  It is Clemson's 7th appearance in the bowl, tying NC State for most appearances in the game.  The Clemson Tigers enter the post-season ranked 15th nationally, while Auburn comes in 22nd.  The game is particularly notable as it was Walter Riggs who came to coach at Clemson from Auburn and who brought with him many traditions, including the Tiger mascot.

Schedule

Game summaries

No. 19 Florida State

Louisiana-Monroe

Furman

at NC State

at Georgia Tech

No. 15 Virginia Tech

Central Michigan

at Maryland

at Duke

Wake Forest

No. 18 Boston College

at South Carolina

vs. No. 22 Auburn (Chick-fil-A Bowl)

Rankings

Depth chart

These are the projected starters and primary backups as of 4/9/07.

Coaching staff
Tommy Bowden – Head Coach
Rob Spence – Offensive Coordinator/Quarterbacks
Vic Koenning – Defensive Coordinator/Defensive Backs
Brad Scott – Assistant Head Coach/Offensive Line
David Blackwell – Linebackers
Andre Powell – Running Backs
Billy Napier – Tight Ends/Recruiting Coordinator
Chris Rumph – Defensive Line
Dabo Swinney – Wide Receivers
Ron West – Outside Linebackers
Mike Dooley – Defensive Video Graduate Assistant
Andy Ford – Defensive Graduate Assistant
Paul Hogan – Offensive Graduate Assistant
Willie Simmons – Offensive Video Graduate Assistant

References

Clemson
Clemson Tigers football seasons
Clemson Tigers football